The 2020 Texas House of Representatives elections took place as part of the biennial United States elections. Texas voters elected state representatives in all 150 of the state house's districts. Primary elections were held in March 2020. Two seats changed hands, both in Harris County, one Democratic flip and one Republican flip, for no net change.

Background 
In the 2018 election, the Texas Democrats had a net gain of 12 seats from the opposing Texas Republicans.

In 2019, House Speaker Dennis Bonnen announced he would not seek reelection.

In October 2020, The Washington Post identified this state election as one of eight whose outcomes could affect partisan balance during post-census redistricting.

Predictions

Polling
House District 26

House District 28

House District 45

House District 54

House District 64

House District 65

House District 66

House District 67

House District 92

House District 93

House District 94

House District 96

House District 97

Generic Democrat vs Generic Republican

House District 102

House District 108

Generic Democrat vs Generic Republican

House District 112

House District 113

House District 121

House District 126

House District 132

House District 134

House District 135

House District 138

Summary of results

Close races 

Seats where the margin of victory was under 10%:

Results by district
Election results:

Detailed results

Districts 1-9

Districts 10-19

Districts 20-29

Districts 30-39

Districts 40-49

See also
 2020 Texas elections

Notes 

Partisan clients

References

Further reading
 . (About redistricting).

External links 
 Texas State House
 Elections Division at the Texas Secretary of State official website
Texas Election Results
 
  (State affiliate of the U.S. League of Women Voters)
 

House of Representatives
Texas House of Representatives elections
Texas House